George Hunter (1902 – after 1926) was an English professional footballer who played as a wing half for Sunderland.

References

1902 births
People from the City of Sunderland
English footballers
Association football wing halves
Hylton Colliery Welfare F.C. players
Sunderland A.F.C. players
Exeter City F.C. players
Workington A.F.C. players
Southend United F.C. players
Doncaster Rovers F.C. players
Scunthorpe United F.C. players
English Football League players
Year of death missing
Footballers from Sunderland